Bucculatrix acrogramma is a moth of the family Bucculatricidae that was first described by Edward Meyrick in 1919. It is found in Australia.

External links
Australian Faunal Directory

Moths of Australia
Bucculatricidae
Moths described in 1919
Taxa named by Edward Meyrick